Waterville GAA is a Gaelic Athletic Association Gaelic football club in Waterville, south County Kerry, Ireland. Former Kerry player & manager Mick O'Dwyer is from the club.
The club grounds have gone under a major renovation in the recent years with a gym, clubhouse and state of the art floodlights.

Achievements
 Kerry Senior Football Championship Runners-Up 1968, 1969, 1970
 South Kerry Senior Football Championship - 11 titles
 Kerry County Football League – Division 1 - 1971
 All-Ireland Football Sevens hosted by Kilmacud Crokes - 1974
 Kerry Intermediate Football Championship - 1993

Notable players
 Mick O'Dwyer
 Denis O'Dwyer
 Karl O'Dwyer
 Mick O'Connell

References

External links
 Official Waterville GAA Club website

Gaelic games clubs in County Kerry
Gaelic football clubs in County Kerry